Ricky Dineen (born 2 April 1962) is an Irish musician best known as the guitarist, and at times bassist with the post-punk band Five Go Down to the Sea?, earlier known as Nun Attax, later as Beethoven–fucking–Beethoven. He wrote most of the band's music and developed their angular guitar style, which he said was in part influenced by The Fire Engines, Gang of Four, The Mekons and Bogshed. 

Five Go Down To The Sea? were active between 1978 and 1985 and released three EPs; Knot a Fish 
(1983), The Glee Club (1984) and Singing in Braille (1985).  His career highlight came in June 1989 when he formed "Beethoven Fucking Beethoven" with FGDTS vocalist Finbarr Donnelly, and their EP Him Goolie Goolie Man, Dem was chosen as "Single of the Week" by the NME. Their success was cut short when Donnelly died in a drowning accident two weeks later. Distraught, Dineen returned to Cork, where he still lives.

Five Go Down to the Sea? were hugely influential on later generations of Irish bands such as The Sultans of Ping FC, and are widely credited for the often quirky and deadpan approach of the 1990s and 2000s Cork scene. Since the mid 2010s, Dineen writes for and plays guitar with the self-described "post-punk geriatric" group Big Boy Foolish. A keen music fan, his current influences include The Ex, Squid, Idles, and Girl Band.

Career

Nun Attax / Five Go Down to the Sea?
Dineen grew up in Churchfield in Cork City, and formed his first band in 1978 with school friends Philip and Keith O’Connell. He met vocalist Finbarr Donnelly in 1978, when they bonded over a shared interest in UFOs and music. Until then Dineen had been a hard rock and Pink Floyd fan; Donnelly introduced him to post-punk and other groups heard on John Peel's BBC radio show. Nun Attax developed an early live following in Ireland, and in the late 1970s became scene leaders in the punk movement that grew around the Arcadia ballroom, managed by Elvera Butler and Andy Foster. Their local breakthrough came in 1981 when three of their songs were included on the Reekus Records live compilation album Kaught at the Kampus, alongside tracks by Microdisney, Mean Features and Urban Blitz.
 
In 1983 they renamed as Five Go Down to the Sea? and recruited Úna Ní Chanainn on cello to play the bass parts. With the addition of a celloist, the band's sound changed significantly , moving away from their punk roots towards a more Captain Beefheart and surreal sound. Nothing when on for longer than two and a half minutes...[it was] a completely focused attack of extreme Cork eccentricity." The band moved to London that winter, where they built a live following across England, with most of their fan base centered in the north. They released two further EPs, The Glee Club (Abstract Sounds, 1984) and Singing in Braille (Creation, 1984). Dineen was unhappy with the Creation recording and said in 2014 that while he liked the Foster, the band was trying to do something that they weren't suited to and that they "were trying to be over the top a bit...and it was a disappointment". The band went into hiatus in 1985, although  Dineen and Donnelly stayed in London and played a number of gigs with a drum machine early in 1986, but without industry interest.

Beethoven Fucking Beethoven
Donnelly and Dinned reformed as Beethoven (at first known as "Beethoven Fucking Beethoven") in 1988 and released the Him Goolie Goolie Man, Dem EP on Setanta Records the following year.  In his review for the NME, writer Steven Wells awarded the record “Single of the Week”, and said that "The centrestone of this jewel of a record is the kidnapping, tarring and feathering, mugging, shagging and destruction of "Day Tripper". Before they could build on this success, Donnelly accidentally drowned 18 June 1989 while swimming in Hyde Park's Serpentine Pond, aged 27. Dineen had been out with him that day, and they had planned to meet up later in the evening. He later said, "If you went out for the craic with your friends on a Sunday afternoon and one of them didn't come back, it's surreal-like. Even though we were both 27, you're still young. It changes your whole life because we went from planning our future, thinking we were going to be in England for a while, to the next minute being on the flight back to Ireland."

Their planned second single was never released. Grief stricken and with the band at a sudden end, Dineen returned to Cork shortly afterwards, where he "drank [his] way though the 1990s", until his career revived in the early 2000s.

Big Boy Foolish
Dineen current band is as music writer and guitarist with Big Boy Foolish, a band with guitarist and vocalist Liam Heffernan, who self describe as "Post punk Geriatrics". In June 2020, they released their debut single "Horsey!", described by McGrath-Bryan in The Evening Echo as continuing Dineen's sound "along a grinning, black-humored trajectory".

In 2021 McGrath-Bryan wrote that "unsatisfied with nostalgia, the pair have spent the last number of years cultivating a body of idiosyncratic, drum machine-propelled tunes that sit somewhere to the left of the current wave of genre revivalism." Their second single, "Up the Airy", was released in August 2020, followed by "B-B-F" that December. Their single "Nunzerkat", which Dinnen said was the ‘fourth in a trilogy", was released in January 2021 and topped the iTunes Music Store's Irish rock category. Their November 2021 single "Bothán" was described as falling "somewhere between their post-punk roots and a mad, spacey take on low, loping country-ish lead guitar." The dance influenced track "Sycophant's Dance" was released in late 2022.

Influence
Five Go Down to the Sea? have steadily grown in popularity since. According to Morty McCarthy of The Sultans Of Ping, they are "the sacred cow of Cork music; they're almost the untouchable band. Every band whose heard of them looks up to [them]." In 2001 Paul McDermott released "Get That Monster off the Stage", a radio documentary about the band. The well received compilation album Hiding from the Landlord was released in April 2020, accompanied by a twenty-page fanzine with contributions from Elvira Butler, Cathal Coughlan of Microdisney, Pete Astor of The Weather Prophets, Gavin Friday of the Virgin Prunes, and writers John Robb, Kevin Barry, Declan Lynch and Cónal Creedon.

Five Go Down to the Sea? were commemorated in August 2020 by a mural on Cork's Grand Parade, a collaboration between Cork City Libraries and Cork City Council to mark the 40th anniversary of the recording of "Kaught at the Kampus". The two panel instillation contained a full size photograph of the band, as well as a reprint of a fanzine interview with them. Writing for the Irish Examiner, McGrath-Bryan said that the mural recognises a "record that has come to be regarded as a document of the Cork music scene at an important juncture, helping to set the tone for the city's subsequent musical reputation, with many of the musicians and personalities involved becoming cult figures in their own right."

Dineen leads the occasional Five Go Down To The Sea? memorial band And NUN Came Back along with vocalist Tom Healy, bassist Humphrey Murphy, and drummer Ian Walsh. A planned FGDTS reunion for early 2020 was canceled due to covid restrictions.

Discography
Nun Attax
 Kaught at the Kampus, various artists recorded at the Arcadia ballroom on 30 August 1980, Reekus Records, released 1981. Re-issued 2015, and 2020
 Dave Fanning Radio Session, RTÉ2, 9 February 1981. Five tracks

Five Go Down to the Sea?
 Knot a Fish, Kabuki Records, 1983. EP
 1st Fanning Session, RTÉ, 18 October November 1983. Five tracks
 The Glee Club, Abstract Sounds, 1984. EP
 2nd Fanning Session, RTÉ2, 20 November 1984. Three tracks
 Singing in Braille, Creation Records, August 1985, EP
 Hiding from the Landlord, AllCity Records, 2020. Compilation album

Beethoven
 Him Goolie Goolie Man, Dem, Setanta Records, June 1989. EP

Big Boy Foolish 
 "Horsey!", single, June 2020
"Up The Airy", single, August 2020
"B-B-F", single, December 2020
"Nunzerkat", single, January 2021
 "Bothán", single, November 2021
 "Sycophant's Dance", single, early 2022

Footnotes

References

Citations

Sources

External links
 Five Go Down To The Sea? @ Facebook
 Big Boy Foolish @ Twitter                                                 
 Big Boy Foolish @ Facebook
 Langer1X, Dineen's YouTube account 
 There's a Fish on Top of Shandon (Swears He's Elvis) Five Go Down To The Sea?
 "Elephants for fun and profit" And NUN Came Back
 "Horsey!" Big Boy Foolish

1962 births
Five Go Down to the Sea? members
Living people
Musicians from Cork (city)
Punk rock guitarists